Grand Isle County is a county in the U.S. state of Vermont. As of the 2020 census, the population was 7,293, making it Vermont's second-least populous county. Its shire town (county seat) is North Hero. The county was created in 1802 and organized in 1805.

Grand Isle County is part of the Burlington metropolitan area. The county does not have a high school; students choose from a number of high schools in neighboring counties.

History
Grand Isle County is one of several Vermont counties created from land ceded by the state of New York on January 15, 1777, when Vermont declared itself to be a distinct state from New York. The land was originally contested by Massachusetts, New Hampshire, New France and New Netherland, but it remained undelineated until July 20, 1764, when King George III established the boundary between New Hampshire and New York along the west bank of the Connecticut River, north of Massachusetts and south of the parallel of 45 degrees north latitude. New York assigned the land gained to Albany County. On March 12, 1772, Albany County was partitioned to create Charlotte County, and this situation persisted until Vermont's independence from New York and Britain, which, however, did not end the contest.

On September 3, 1783, as a result of the signing of the Treaty of Paris, the Revolutionary War ended with Great Britain recognizing the independence of the United States. Vermont's border with Quebec was established at 45 degrees north latitude, which explains why this county has no dry-land connection to the rest of the United States.

Massachusetts did not formally withdraw its claim to the region, first made in 1629, until December 16, 1786. New York, still not satisfied with the relinquishment of its land to Vermont, asked the U.S. Congress to arbitrate the matter. Congress ruled against New York on March 7, 1788.

Subsequently, when Vermont petitioned for statehood, Congress ordered a joint commission to settle the border between New York and Vermont. This commission ruled before Vermont's admission, which took place on March 4, 1791, but a small change they permitted has never been acted upon. Grand Isle County was created in 1802 from parts of Franklin and Chittenden Counties.

In the late 19th century the Rutland Railroad ran service from northern New York State by the Canada–U.S. border, along the west side of Vermont to Rutland, Vermont, and south to Chatham, New York. From 1899 a series of causeways provided continuous train service north–south through the Lake Champlain islands, making a direct connection to Burlington. The last service from Alburgh was in 1948.

Geography
It has the highest proportion of water coverage of any county in the state. It is the smallest county in Vermont by area, and the second-smallest by population (only Essex County has fewer people). Four of its five towns (North Hero, South Hero, Grand Isle and Isle La Motte) are situated entirely on islands in Lake Champlain, while Alburgh is on a peninsula (an exclave known as the Alburgh Tongue) extending south into the lake from Quebec. The highest elevation in the county is only 279 feet, on the west side of South Hero. The lake shoreline elevation is generally 99' above sea level.

Adjacent counties
 Franklin County – east
 Chittenden County – southeast
 Clinton County, New York – west
 Le Haut-Richelieu Regional County Municipality, Quebec – north

Major highways

Demographics

2000 census
As of the census of 2000, there were 6,901 people, 2,761 households, and 1,954 families living in the county.  The population density was 84 people per square mile (32/km2).  There were 4,663 housing units at an average density of 56 per square mile (22/km2).  The racial makeup of the county was 97.41% White, 0.14% Black or African American, 0.87% Native American, 0.23% Asian, 0.04% Pacific Islander, 0.03% from other races, and 1.28% from two or more races.  0.42% of the population were Hispanic or Latino of any race. 18.8% were of French, 14.6% French Canadian, 14.3% English, 10.6% American, 8.9% Irish and 7.4% German ancestry. 95.0% spoke English and 3.8% French as their first language.

There were 2,761 households, out of which 31.20% had children under the age of 18 living with them, 60.10% were married couples living together, 7.10% had a female householder with no husband present, and 29.20% were non-families. 22.20% of all households were made up of individuals, and 8.20% had someone living alone who was 65 years of age or older.  The average household size was 2.50 and the average family size was 2.93.

In the county, the population was spread out, with 24.80% under the age of 18, 5.60% from 18 to 24, 28.70% from 25 to 44, 28.50% from 45 to 64, and 12.30% who were 65 years of age or older.  The median age was 40 years. For every 100 females, there were 99.90 males.  For every 100 females age 18 and over, there were 97.90 males.

The median income for a household in the county was $43,033, and the median income for a family was $48,878. Males had a median income of $35,539 versus $26,278 for females. The per capita income for the county was $22,207.  About 5.90% of families and 7.60% of the population were below the poverty line, including 9.20% of those under age 18 and 7.90% of those age 65 or over.

2010 census
As of the 2010 United States Census, there were 6,970 people, 2,902 households, and 2,027 families living in the county. The racial makeup of the county was 95.3% white, 0.9% American Indian, 0.4% black or African American, 0.3% Asian, 0.1% Pacific islander, 0.3% from other races, and 2.8% from two or more races. Those of Hispanic or Latino origin made up 1.1% of the population. In terms of ancestry, 18.0% were English, 14.2% were Irish, 10.6% were French Canadian, 10.3% were German, 10.3% were American, and 6.9% were Scottish.

Of the 2,902 households, 28.4% had children under the age of 18 living with them, 56.2% were married couples living together, 8.6% had a female householder with no husband present, 30.2% were non-families, and 22.5% of all households were made up of individuals. The average household size was 2.40 and the average family size was 2.79. The median age was 45.5 years.

The median income for a household in the county was $57,436 and the median income for a family was $66,686. Males had a median income of $46,569 versus $36,514 for females. The per capita income for the county was $30,499. About 6.1% of families and 6.4% of the population were below the poverty line, including 9.9% of those under age 18 and 3.7% of those age 65 or over.

Politics
In 1828, Grand Isle County was won by National Republican Party candidate John Quincy Adams and in 1832 was won by Henry Clay.

From William Henry Harrison in 1836 to Winfield Scott in 1852, the county voted for Whig Party candidates.

From John C. Frémont in 1856 to William Howard Taft in 1908, the Republican Party had a 52-year winning streak in the county.

In 1912, Democratic Party candidate Woodrow Wilson won the county, making him the first Democratic presidential candidate to win the county and the first since Lewis Cass in 1848 to win any Vermont county. Wilson also won the county in 1916.

Republican candidates Warren Harding, Calvin Coolidge and Herbert Hoover won the county in 1920, 1924 and 1928, respectively.

Democratic candidate Franklin D. Roosevelt won Grand Isle County in all four of his presidential runs, from 1932 to 1944. During that time, Grand Isle, Chittenden and Franklin Counties became Democratic enclaves in an otherwise Republican-voting Vermont. The county was also won by Harry S. Truman in 1948.

Dwight D. Eisenhower won back Franklin County for the Republicans in the 1952 and 1956 elections.

The county went to Democratic candidates John F. Kennedy in 1960 and Lyndon B. Johnson in 1964.

Richard Nixon carried the county in 1968 and in 1972, as did Gerald Ford in 1976.

In 1980, the county was narrowly won by Democrat Jimmy Carter; in 1984, the county was won by Ronald Reagan, the last Republican presidential candidate to win Grand Isle County.

Since Michael Dukakis in 1988, the county has been won by Democratic candidates.

In the 2004, Grand Isle County chose John Kerry over George W. Bush by 12 points, with Kerry carrying all six municipalities.

In 2008, Barack Obama carried the county by a 28.2% margin over John McCain, with Obama winning by 37% statewide.

|}

Communities

Towns
 Alburgh
 Grand Isle
 Isle La Motte
 North Hero (shire town)
 South Hero

Village
 Alburgh

Census-designated place
 South Hero

Notable person
 Bernie Sanders, former mayor of Burlington (1981–1989), U.S. Senator from Vermont since 2007, and 2016 and 2020 Democratic presidential candidate

See also
 List of counties in Vermont
 List of towns in Vermont
 National Register of Historic Places listings in Grand Isle County, Vermont

References

External links

 
 National Register of Historic Places listing for Grand Isle Co., Vermont
 Grand Isle County Sheriff's Office

 
1805 establishments in Vermont
Populated places established in 1805
Burlington, Vermont metropolitan area